Şıxlar (also, Shiglyar and Shykhlyar) is a village and municipality in the Masally Rayon of Azerbaijan.

References 

Populated places in Masally District